Markus Krunegård (born 6 April 1979 in Norrköping, Östergötland, Sweden) is a Swedish-Finnish singer and songwriter.

Career

On 2 April 2008 he released his solo album 'Markusevangeliet', with the debut single "Jag är en vampyr" made it to the Top 5 on Sverigetopplistan. The same year he appeared on albums by Annika Norlin, Johnossi and Eldkvarn. He also toured with Lars Winnerbäck in summer of 2008 followed by an extensive solo tour. He was nominated for several awards including Rockbjörnen, Grammisgalan and P3 Guld.

He followed by releases of Prinsen av Peking and Lev som en gris, dö som en hund in 2009. His album Mänsklig värme released on 28 March 2012 entered the Swedish Albums Chart straight at No. 1 making it his biggest success ever.

Other Projects
Pello Revolvers
Pello Revolvers is a band formed by songwriter Hans-Erik Kangasharju, which includes Hans-Erik Kangasharju (acoustic guitar, electric guitar, vocals), Tobias Henriksson (drummer, carillon, mandolin, vocals), Johan Sammelin (electric and bass guitar, melodica, drum machine, synthesizer, producer), Robert Arlinder (electric and bass guitar), Markus Krunegård (bass and electric guitar, backing vocals), Ralf Rotmalm (bass, synthesizer), Anna Edemo (violin, backing vocals) and David Nygård (trombone, accordion, backing vocals, carillon, percussion).

Pello Revolvers formed in 2001 and signed to Massive Decline of Power Against Recordings. They released the self-titled Pello Revolvers in 2003, Borg Mesch in 2004 and No Spare Tyres in 2005.

P3 Live
Between January 2008 and August 2009, Krunegård hosted the radio show P3 Live at Sveriges Radio P3.

Laakso (2001–2007)
Besides his solo career, he is also a member of the Swedish indie band Laakso, with the other members being David Nygård, Lars Skoglund and Mikael Fritz. The band has released four albums; I Miss You I'm Pregnant in 2003, My Gods in 2005, as well as Mother am I Good Looking? and Mämmilärock, both in 2007. Their fifth album, titled Grateful Dead is set to be released on 22 April 2016. They have also released the EPs BALE, Long Beach, Aussie Girl, High Drama and Västerbron & Vampires, as well as two standalone singles; Demon in 2003, and Laakso in 2004.

Hets (2006–2007)
Krunegård has also been a member of the defunct supergroup Hets with Henrik Svensson (from Doktor Kosmos), Christoffer Roth (from De Lyckliga Kompisarna (DLK) and Monster) and Per Nordmark (from Fireside). The short-lived project was formed in 2006 and disbanded in 2007. They released one self-titled album on their own record label Etikett: Hets. Their song "Hasses brorsas låtsassyrras kompis fest" was used as main theme for the swedish young adult tv-show "Hasses brorsas låtsassyrras kompis", aired 2007-2008 on SVT.

Serenades (2011)
In April 2011, he announced the forming of the duo Serenades together with Adam Olenius from Shout Out Louds. Their first release was the EP Birds, released on 18 April 2011.

Personal life
Krunegård grew up in Röda Stan, a neighborhood of Norrköping and studied at the local Hagagymnasiet Haga School in Norrköping. Besides his Swedish origin, he also has roots in Pello in the Finnish Torne Valley on the Swedish-Finnish border. Krunegård is married and has one daughter born in 2011.

Discography

Albums

EPs
2009: Lead Singer Syndrome EP

Singles
2008: "Jag är en vampyr"
2008: "Det är ett idogt jobb att driva ungdomen ut ur sin kropp"
2009: "Hela livet var ett disco"
2009: "Hollywood Hills"
2010: "Lev som en gris dö som en hund"
2012: "Everybody Hurts"
2012: "Askan är den bästa jorden"
2014: "Du stör dig hårt på mig"
2014: "Let's go nu är jag din yo"

Awards

|-
| 2009
| Jag är en Vampyr
| Song of the Year
| P3 Guld
| 
| Notes
| 
|-
| 2009
| Markusevangeliet
| Artist of the Year
| P3 Guld
| 
| Notes
| 
|-
| 2009
| Markusevangeliet
| Pop Artist (Male) of the Year
| Grammis
| 
| Notes
| 
|-
| 2009
| Markusevangeliet
| New Artist of the Year
| Grammis
| 
| Notes
| 
|-
| 2009
| Jag är en Vampyr
| Song of the Year
| Grammis
| 
| Notes
| 
|-
| 2009
| Markusevangeliet
| New Artist of the Year
| Rockbjörnen
| 
| Notes
| 
|-
| 2009
| Markusevangeliet
| Pop Artist (Male) of the Year
| Rockbjörnen
| 
| Notes
| 
|-
| 2009
| Jag är en Vampyr
| Song of the Year
| Rockbjörnen
| 
| Notes
| 
|-
| 2012
| -
| Swedish Live artist of the Year
| GAFFA-Priset
| 
| Notes
| 
|-
| 2013
| Mänsklig Värme
| Album of the Year
| Grammis
| 
| Notes
| 
|-
| 2013
| Mänsklig Värme
| Producer of the Year
| Grammis
| 
| Co-produced with Lars Skoglund
| 
|-
| 2014
| -
| Swedish Live artist of the Year
| GAFFA-Priset
| 
| Notes
|

References

External links
Official website

Swedish songwriters
Swedish-language singers
1979 births
Living people
Swedish people of Finnish descent
21st-century Swedish singers
21st-century Swedish male singers